The Anglican Diocese of Umuahia is one of nine within the Anglican Province of Aba, itself one of 14 provinces within the Church of Nigeria: bishops of the diocese include Ikechi Nwosu and the current incumbent Geoffrey Obijuru Ibeabuchi.

Notes

Church of Nigeria dioceses
Dioceses of the Province of Aba